Betrayal is a science fiction novel by American writer Lois Tilton, part of the  Star Trek: Deep Space Nine saga.

Plot
Ambassadors from all over the Federation have assembled on Deep Space Nine for a conference that will determine the future of the planet Bajor. Keeping dozens of alien ambassadors happy is hard enough, but when hidden terrorists start blowing up the station, Commander Benjamin Sisko must track a hidden enemy who strikes at will. Then things get even worse: a new Cardassian commander arrives, demanding the return of Deep Space Nine to the Cardassian Empire. With Deep Space Nine now a dangerous minefield, Sisko must defuse a situation that threatens the very existence of the planet Bajor.

Sales
Betrayal spent 4 weeks in the USA Today best sellers list, reaching a peak position of 29.

References

External links

1994 American novels
American science fiction novels
Novels based on Star Trek: Deep Space Nine
Pocket Books books